William Jan Pucovski (born 2 February 1998) is an Australian cricketer. He made his List A debut for Cricket Australia XI against Pakistan during their tour of Australia on 10 January 2017. He made his first-class debut for Victoria in the 2016–17 Sheffield Shield season on 1 February 2017. Pucovski made his international debut for the Australia cricket team on 7 January 2021, in the third Test match of the series against India.

Early life
Pucovski was born in Malvern, a suburb of Melbourne, Victoria. His father, Ján Pucovski, who emigrated to Australia as a child from Serbia, has Czechoslovakian roots. Ján also played cricket, as a fast bowler, and was regarded as a "Caulfield legend".

Pucovski completed school at Brighton Grammar School in 2015, and was captain of the school's First XI and a school prefect. He was awarded the Bradman Young Cricketer of the Year at the Allan Border Medal ceremony by Cricket Australia in 2019.

Cricket career
In the 2016-17 Under 19 National Championships, Pucovski scored four consecutive hundreds on his way to being named Player of the Championship and totalling 650 runs from eight innings, breaking the long-standing runs record held by Queensland's Jerry Cassel (568) since 1993–94.

In March 2018, he suffered a second concussion from bouncers in two years, the second of which was bowled by Sean Abbott. Pucovski was well enough to walk off the field unaided. In October 2018, he became only the second player representing Victoria in the Sheffield Shield, after Dean Jones, to hit a double century against the Western Australia cricket team at the WACA. Totalling 243 not out, Pucovski became just the ninth player in Sheffield Shield history to score a double-century before his 21st birthday. However, later the same month, he announced he would be taking a break from cricket due to a mental health-related illness.

In January 2019, he was named in Australia's Test squad for the series against Sri Lanka. After being named in the squad for the Test series, Pucovski said that it's every kid's dream to play for their country, and that getting that opportunity was "just amazing". However, he was not selected to play in either match during the series, and was released from the squad at the start of the Canberra Test, allowing him to continue to work on his mental health.

Ahead of the 2019–20 Marsh One-Day Cup, Pucovski was named as one of the six cricketers to watch during the tournament. In October 2020, in the third round of the 2020–21 Sheffield Shield season, Pucovski and Marcus Harris scored 486 runs for the first wicket in the match against South Australia, setting a new partnership record in the Sheffield Shield. Pucovski finished his innings on 255 not out, his highest score in first-class cricket. The following match, he scored 202 runs in the first innings, becoming the first batsman since Dene Hills in the 1997–98 season to score consecutive double-hundreds in the Sheffield Shield.

In November 2020, Pucovski was named in Australia's Test squad for their series against India. Pucovski suffered another concussion playing for Australia A in December 2020, bringing the total to nine concussions before playing a single game for Australia. He made his Test debut for Australia on 7 January 2021, against India, scoring 62 in his maiden Test innings. Pucovski had his baggy green cap presented to him by Andrew McDonald. However, during his debut, Pucovski suffered an injury to his shoulder that required reconstruction surgery which ruled him out of playing for six months. In February 2022, during the 2021–22 Sheffield Shield season, Pucovski suffered another concussion, the eleventh one of his career. In October 2022, Pucovski announced that he would be taking an indefinite leave from cricket.

References

External links
 

1998 births
Living people
Australian cricketers
Cricket Australia XI cricketers
Cricketers from Melbourne
Victoria cricketers
Australian people of Czech descent
People educated at Brighton Grammar School
Australia Test cricketers
People from Malvern, Victoria
Melbourne Cricket Club cricketers